
The 4 x 100 metres relay at the 1987 World Championships in Athletics was held at the Stadio Olimpico on September 5 and September 6.

Medals

Results
All times shown are in seconds.

Final

Heats

Heat 1

Heat 2

References
IAAF results, heats
IAAF results, final

4 x 100 metres relay women
Relays at the World Athletics Championships
4 × 100 metres relay
1987 in women's athletics